This is a list of butterflies of Belize. According to a recent estimate, there are about 700 butterfly species in Belize.

Papilionidae

Papilioninae
Battus philenor acauda
Battus polydamas polydamas
Battus laodamas copanae
Battus chalceus ingenuus
Battus lycidas
Parides photinus
Parides montezuma tulana
Parides eurimedes mylotes
Parides childrenae childrenae
Parides sesostris zestos
Parides panares lycimenes
Parides erithalion polyzelus
Parides iphidamas iphidamas
Protographium epidaus epidaus
Protographium philolaus philolaus
Protographium agesilaus neosilaus
Protographium dioxippus lacandones
Protographium calliste calliste
Protographium thyastes marchandii
Eurytides salvini
Protesilaus macrosilaus penthesilaus
Mimoides thymbraeus thymbraeus
Mimoides ilus branchus
Mimoides phaon phaon
Heraclides pharnaces rogeri
Heraclides erostratus erostratus
Heraclides anchisiades idaeus
Heraclides torquatus tolus
Heraclides ornythion
Heraclides astyalus pallas
Heraclides androgeus epidaurus
Heraclides thoas autocles
Heraclides paeon thrason
Papilio cresphontes
Papilio polyxenes asterius
Pterourus garamas electryon
Pterourus menatius victorinus

Pieridae

Dismorphinae
Enantia licinia marion
Enantia albania albania
Dismorphia eunoe eunoe
Dismorphia amphiona praxinoe
Dismorphia theucharila fortunata

Pierinae
Archonias tereas approximata
Charonias eurytele nigrescens
Melete florinda florinda
Melete isandra
Appias drusilla drusilla
Itaballia demophile calydonia
Itaballia pandosia kicaha
Pieriballia viardi laogore
Perrhybris pamela
Ascia monuste monuste
Ganyra josephina josepha

Coliadinae
Zerene cesonia cesonia
Anteos clorinde
Anteos maerula
Kricogonia lyside lyside
Phoebis rurina intermedia
Phoebis philea philea
Phoebis argante argante
Phoebis agarithe agarithe
Phoebis sennae marcellina
Phoebis trite trite
Aphrissa statira jada
Aphrissa boisduvalii
Eurema proterpia
Eurema mexicana mexicana
Eurema xanthochlora
Eurema boisduvaliana
Eurema dina westwoodi
Eurema albula
Eurema nise nelphe
Eurema lisa lisa
Eurema nicippe
Eurema daira lydia
Nathalis iole

Riodinidae

Euselasiinae
Hades noctula
Euselasia aurantiaca
Euselasia cataleuca
Euselasia hieronymi
Euselasia mys
Euselasia pusilla

Riodininae
Perophthalma tullius lasius
Leucochimona nivalis
Leucochimona vestalis
Mesosemia gaudiolum
Mesosemia lamachus
Mesosemia methion
Napaea eucharila
Napaea umbra
Eurybia lycisca
Eurybia patrona persona
Lyropteryx lyra cleadas
Ancyluris inca inca
Ancyluris jurgenseni
Rhetus periander
Rhetus arcius thia
Melanis iarbas
Melanis pixe pixe
Isapis agyrtus hera
Lepricornis strigosus
Baeotis zonata
Caria lampeto
Charis auius
Charis gynaea zama
Charis velutina
Calephelis argyrodines
Calephelis browni
Calephelis clenchi
Calephelis fulmen
Calephelis maya
Calephelis stallingsi
Calephelis tikal
Calephelis yucatana
Calephelis wellingi wellingi
Lasaia sula
Lasaia agesilas
Lasaia oileus
Mesene celetes
Mesene croceella
Mesene leucopus
Mesene phareus rubella
Esthemopsis alicia
Chimastrum argentea
Symmachia acusatrix
Symmachia probetor
Anteros carausius carausius
Sarota craspediodinata
Sarota chrysus dematria
Calydna lusca venusta
Calydna sturnula hegias
Emesis lucinda aurima
Emesis mandana
Emesis lupina
Emesis saturata
Emesis ocipore
Emesis tegula
Emesis tenedia
Emesis vulpina
Pachythone ignifer
Apodemia hypoglauca wellingi
Thisbe irenea belides
Thisbe lycorias lycorias
Lemonias agave
Juditha ascolides
Juditha molpe
Synargis mycone
Synargis nymphidioides
Pandemos godmanii
Calosphila cilissa
Hypophyla sudias
Caliocasma lilina
Theope basilea
Theope cratylus
Theope diores
Theope virgilius
Nymphidium ascolia

Lycaenidae

Theclinae
Eumaeus childrenae
Eumaeus toxea
Arcas cypria
Evenus regalis
Evenus telemus antinous
Evenus gabriela
Pseudolycaena damo
Theritas mavors
Cycnus phaleros
Thereus citonius cambes
Thereus lausus
Panthiades battus jalan
Panthiades bitias bitias
Panthiades ochus
Arawacus jada
Arawacus phaea
Arawacus phaenna
Arawacus sito
Arawacus togarna
Pendantus sethon
Celmia celmus
Tmolus cydrara
Tmolus dolium
Tmolus echiolus
Ministrymon maevia
Ministrymon azia
Ministrymon scopas
Ministrymon coronata
Oenomaus ortygnus
Oenomais rustan
Allosmaitia pion
Chalybs janias
Janthecla janthodonia
Thecla halciones
Thecla conoveria
Ocaria thales
Thecla empusa
Siderus tephraeus
Parrhasius polibetes
Parrhasius orgia melissa
Michaelus ira
Cyanophrys miserabilis
Cyanophrys herodutus
Rekoa marius
Rekoa meton
Rekoa palegon
Orcya ahola
Atlides bacis
Atlides polybe
Brangas caraunus
Calystryma trebula
Calycopis isobeon
Electrostrymon denarius
Serratofalca sasha
Mercedes demonassa
Mercedes mimas
Ziegleria hesperitis
Gigantorubra shueyi
Strymon albata sedecia
Strymon bazochii
Strymon bubastus
Strymon cestri
Strymon columella
Strymon mulucha
Strymon serapio
Strymon yojoa
Strymon basilides
Strymon gabatha
Thecla barajo

Polyommatinae
Brephidium exilis exilis
Leptotes cassius striata
Leptotes marina
Zizula cyna tulliola
Hemiargus ceraunus gyas
Hemiargus hanno
Everes comyntas texana

Nymphalidae

Libytheidae
Libytheana carinenta mexicana

Danainae
Danaus plexippus plexippus
Danaus gilippus thersippus
Danaus eresimus montezuma
Lycorea cleobaea atergatis
Lycorea ilione albescens
Anetia thirza thirza

Ithomiinae
Tithorea tarricina duenna
Tithorea harmonia hippothous
Melinaea ethra imitata
Thyridia psidii melantho
Mechanitis lysimnia doryssus
Mechanitis polymnia lycidice
Mechanitis menapis saturata
Napeogenes tolosa tolosa
Hypothyris euclea valora
Hypothyris lycaste dionaea
Ithomia patilla
Ithomia leila
Aeria eurimedia pacifica
Hyposcada virginiana nigricosta
Oleria zea
Oleria paula
Callithomia hezia hedila
Dircenna klugii
Dircenna dero euchytma
Godyris zavaleta sosunga
Greta oto
Greta nero
Greta morgane
Greta andromica lyra
Greta anette
Episcada salvinia
Hypoleria cassotis
Pteronymia artena artena
Pteronymia cotytto

Heliconiinae
Euptoieta hegesia hoffmanni
Actinote pellenea guatemalena
Actinote anteas
Philaethria dido diatonica
Dryadula phaetusa
Dione juno huascuma
Agraulis vanillae incarnata
Dryas iulia moderata
Eueides aliphera gracilis
Eueides lineata
Eueides vibilia vialis
Eueides procula asidia
Eueides isabella eva
Heliconius charithonia vazquezae
Heliconius cydno galanthus
Heliconius doris transiens
Heliconius erato petiverana
Heliconius hecalesia octavia
Heliconius hecale zuleika
Heliconius ismenius telchinia
Heliconius hortense
Heliconius sapho leuce
Heliconius sara

Nymphalinae
Chlosyne janais
Chlosyne gaudealis
Chlosyne erodyle
Chlosyne lacinia
Thessalia theona
Anthanassa drusilla lelex
Anthanassa argentea
Anthanassa ptolyca
Anthanassa ardys
Anthanassa tulcis
Phyciodes phaon
Phyciodes vesta graphica
Eresia clara
Eresia phillyra
Castilia eranites
Castilia ofella
Castilia myia
Tegosa guatemalena
Colobura dirce
Tigridia acesta
Baeotus baeotus
Historis odius odius
Historis acheronta acheronta
Smyrna blomfildia datis
Biblis hyperia aganisa
Mestra amymone
Hamadryas februa ferentina
Hamadryas honorina
Hamadryas feronia farinulenta
Hamadryas guatemalena guatemalena
Hamadryas ipthime joannae
Hamadryas amphinome mexicana
Hamadryas laodamia saurites
Ectima erycinoides
Myscelia cyaniris cyaniris
Myscelia ethusa ethusa
Dynamine theseus
Dynamine thalassina
Dynamine mylitta
Dynamine artemisia glauce
Dynamine dyonis
Marpesia petreus
Marpesia chiron marius
Marpesia berania
Marpesia harmonia
Eunica tatila caerula
Eunica monima modesta
Eunica alcmena alcmena
Temenis laothoe liberia
Epiphile adrasta adrasta
Nica flavilla canthara
Pyrrhogyra neaerea hypsenor
Pyrrhogyra otolais neis
Pyrrhogyra crameri
Pyrrhogyra edocla aenaria
Catonephele mexicana
Catonephele numilia esite
Nessaea aglaura aglaura
Diaethria anna
Diaethria astala astala
Callicore lyca lyca
Callicore texa titania
Callicore guatemalena
Callicore patelina patelina
Adelpha melanthe
Adelpha salmoneus salmonides
Adelpha cytherea marcia
Adelpha basiloides
Adelpha iphicla iphicleola
Adelpha massilia
Adelpha phylaca
Adelpha naxia epiphicla
Adelpha ixia leucas
Adelpha serpa sentia
Adelpha celerio
Adelpha fessonia
Adelpha felderi falcata
Hypanartia godmani
Hypanartia lethe
Siproeta epaphus epaphus
Siproeta stelenes biplagiata
Siproeta superba superba
Anartia fatima
Anartia jatrophae luteipicta
Vanessa virginiensis
Vanessa cardui
Junonia evarete zonalis
Junonia genoveva

Apaturinae
Doxocopa pavon
Doxocopa laure
Asterocampa idyja argus

Charaxinae
Prepona dexamenus medinai
Prepona gnorima
Prepona omphale octavia
Archaeoprepona demophon centralis
Archaeoprepona demophon gulina
Archaeoprepona meander phoebus
Archaeoprepona amphimachus amphimachus
Siderone marthesia
Zaretis ellops
Zaretis itys
Zaretis callidryas
Consul fabius cecrops
Consul electra
Anaea aidea
Fountainea eurypyle confusa
Fountainea glycerium
Memphis morvus boisduvali
Memphis forreri
Memphis oenomais
Memphis hedemanni
Memphis orthesia
Memphis xenica
Memphis artacaena
Memphis herbaceae
Memphis pithyusa

Morphinae
Antirrhea miltiades
Morpho theseus justitiae
Morpho polyphemus luna
Morpho peleides montezuma

Brassolinae
Dynastor macrosiris strix
Dynastor darius stygianus
Opsiphanes boisduvalii
Opsiphanes tamarindi tamarindi
Opsiphanes quiteria quirinus
Opsiphanes invirae cuspidatus
Opsiphanes cassina fabricii
Catoblepia berecynthia whittakeri
Eryphanis aesacus aesacus
Caligo oileus scamander
Caligo illioneus oberon
Caligo memnon memnon
Caligo eurilochus sulanus
Caligo uranus
Narope cyllastros testacea

Satyrinae
Pierella luna heracles
Manataria maculata
Cyllopsis wellingi
Cyllopsis gemma freemani
Taygetis mermeria excavata
Taygetis nympha
Taygetis rufomarginata
Taygetis leuctra
Taygetis inconspicua
Taygetis kerea
Pseudodebis zimri
Euptychia westwoodi
Euptychia mollis
Megeuptychia antonoe
Vareuptychia similis
Vareuptychia usitata pieria
Cissia confusa
Cissia pseudoconfusa
Cissia labe
Magneuptychia libye
Pareuptychia metaleuca
Pareuptychia ocirrhoe
Ypthimoides remissa
Hermeuptychia hermes
Chloreuptychia sericeella
Cepheuptychia glaucina

Hesperiidae
Achalarus albociliatus
Achalarus toxeus
Achlyodes busirus heros
Achlyodes mithridates thraso
Achlyodes tamenund
Aethilla echina
Aethilla lavochrea
Aguna asander
Aguna aurunce hypozonius
Aguna claxon
Aguna metophis
Aguna panama
Aides brilla
Aides dysoni
Anastrus neaeris
Anastrus tolimus
Anatrytone mella
Anisochoria pedaliodina
Anisochoria polysticta
Anthoptus epictetus
Antigonus corosus
Antigonus erosus
Antigonus nearchus
Argyrogrammana stilbe holosticta
Arteurotia tractipennis
Astraptes alardus
Astraptes alector hopferi
Astraptes anaphus annetta
Astraptes aulestes
Astraptes creteus crana
Astraptes egregius
Astraptes enotrus
Astraptes fulgerator azul
Astraptes janeria
Astraptes phalaecus
Astraptes talus
Atarnes sallei
Autochton aunus
Autochton bipunctatus
Autochton longipennis
Autochton neis
Autochton zarex
Behemothia godmanii
Bolla imbras
Bungalotis astylos
Bungalotis midas
Bungalotis milleri
Bungalotis quadratum
Cabares potrillo
Callimormus alsimo
Callimormus juventus
Callimormus saturnus
Calpodes ethilius
Camptopleura auxo
Cantha roraimae
Capaeodes minima
Carrhenes canescens
Carrhenes fuscescens
Carystoides basoches
Carystoides escalantei
Carystoides lila
Carystoides mexicana
Carystus phorcus
Celaenorrhinus stola
Cephise cephise
Chioides albofasciatus
Chioides catillus
Chioides zilpa
Chiomara mithrax
Cobalus fidicula
Codatractus carlos
Cogia calchas
Conga chydaea
Corticea corticea
Cymaenes odilia trebius
Cymaenes tripunctus
Cynea corope
Damas clavus
Dubiella fiscella belpa
Ebrietas anacreon
Ebrietas evanidus
Elbella patrobas
Elbella scylla
Entheus matho matho
Epargyreus aspina
Epargyreus deleoni
Epargyreus exadeus
Epargyreus spina
Epargyreus zestos
Euphyes chamuli
Euphyes peneia
Gorgythion begga pyralina
Gorgythion vox
Grais stigmaticus
Helias cama
Helias phalaenoides
Heliopetes alana
Heliopetes arsalte
Heliopetes ericetorum
Heliopetes macaira
Heliopetes nivella
Hylephila phyleus
Inglorius mediocris
Jemadia pseudognetus
Justinia phaetusa norda
Lerema accius
Lerema liris
Lerodea arabus
Lerodea eufala
Lindra brasus brasus
Melanopyge hoffmanni
Methionopsis dolor
Mictris crispus
Milanion marciana
Mnasicles geta
Mnasitheus cephoides
Mnasitheus nitra
Moeris hyagnis hyagnis
Monca crispinus
Monca telata
Morys lyde
Morys micythus
Morys valerius
Mylon jason
Mylon pelopidas
Mylon salvia
Myrinia myris
Naevolus orius
Narcosius parisi helen
Nascus phocus
Neoxeniades scipio luda
Niconiades nikko
Niconiades nikko
Nisoniades godma
Nisoniades rubescens
Noctuana stator
Onophas columbaria
Orthos lycortas
Ouleus fridericus panna
Ouleus negrus
Paches loxus zonula
Pachyneuria licisca
Panoquina evansi
Panoquina hecebola
Panoquina lucas
Panoquina ocola
Panoquina pauper
Papias dictys
Parphorus decora
Passova gellias
Pellicia angra
Pellicia arina
Pellicia dimidiata dimidiata
Perichares adela
Perichares philetes
Phanus marshalli
Phanus vitreus
Phlebodes campo sifax
Phocides belus
Phocides pigmalion
Phocides polybius lilea
Polites vibex
Polyctor cleta
Polyctor enops
Polyctor polyctor polyctor
Polygonus leo
Polygonus manueli
Polygonus savigny
Polythrix asine
Polythrix caunus
Polythrix kanshul
Polythrix metallescens
Polythrix octomaculata
Pompeius pompeius
Porphyrogenes vulpecula
Proteides mercurius
Pyrgus adepta
Pyrgus oileus
Pyrrhopyge erythrosticta
Pyrrhopyge zenodorus zenodorus
Pythonides jovianus
Quadrus cerealis
Quadrus francesius
Quadrus lugubris
Quasimellana antipazina
Quasimellana eulogius
Quasimellana mexicana
Quasimellana myron
Remella remus
Remella vopiscus
Remella duena
Repens florus
Ridens allyni
Saliana longirostris
Saliana triangularis
Sostrata bifasciata
Sostrata nordica
Spathilepia clonius
Staphylus azteca
Staphylus ceos
Staphylus mazans
Staphylus vulgata
Synapte pecta
Telemiades avitus
Telemiades choricus
Thracides phidon
Thracides thrasea
Timochares ruptifasciata
Timochares trifasciata
Tosta gorgus
Tromba xanthura
Typhedanus ampyx
Typhedanus salas
Urbanus albimargo
Urbanus belli
Urbanus dorantes dorantes
Urbanus doryssus
Urbanus esmeraldus
Urbanus esta
Urbanus procne
Urbanus pronta
Urbanus proteus
Urbanus simplicius
Urbanus tanna
Urbanus teleus
Vacerra gayra
Vehilius illudens
Vehilius stictomenes
Vettius fantasos
Vettius onaca
Wallengrenia otho
Xenophanes tryxus
Zariaspes mys
Zera tetrastigma tetrastigma
Zonia zonia panamensis

See also 
 Fauna of Belize

References
biological-diversity.info
Biodiversity and Environmental Resource Data System of Belize (BERDS)

Butterflies

Belize
Belize
Belize